Seleucis of Syria was a region of the Seleucid Empire located in northern Syria. It was also known as the Syrian Tetrapolis,

The four cities had been founded by Seleucus Nicator;
Antioch—named after his father and the largest city.
Laodiceia—after his mother.
Apameia—after his wife Apama.
Seleuceia in Pieria—eponym of Seleucus.

See also
 Syria (region)

References

Latakia
Seleucid Empire